Lisa Neumann (born 23 December 1993) is a Welsh Rugby Union player who plays wing for the Wales women's national rugby union team and Sale Sharks. Neumann made her international debut in 2018, and represented the Wales squad at the 2021 Women's Six Nations Championship.

Club career 
Neumann began playing rugby as a child, first at Croesgoch Primary and then at Ysgol Dewi Sant. After playing for the Haverfordwest girls' team, she moved to Haverfordwest Ladies in 2016.

She then went on to play for the Scarlets and Firwood Waterloo Ladies, before signing with her current club, the Sale Sharks, in 2020.

She has also played at a regional level for Rygbi Gogledd Cymru (RGC), the regional representative team for the North Wales Rugby Development Region.

International career 
Neumann made her international debut with RGC in 2018, in a match against Scotland. Also in 2018, she made her first start for the Wales women's squad in a Six Nations Championship match against Ireland. She then went on to play in every fixture in the 2020 Women's Six Nations Championship prior to the final match being postponed.

During the 2021 Women's Six Nations Championship, Neumann scored Wales' first try of the tournament against Scotland.

Neumann has won 22 caps during her rugby career to date. She was selected in Wales squad for the 2021 Rugby World Cup in New Zealand.

Personal life 
Born in Swansea, Neumann attended Croesgoch Primary and Ysgol Dewi Sant before moving to the University of Manchester, where she graduated in 2016 with a first-class honours degree in biomedical science.

Prior to completing her studies, Neumann worked for the RNLI as a senior beach lifeguard. In 2018, she moved to the Manchester Academic Health Science Centre Clinical Trials Unit (MAHSC-CTU), hosted by  The Christie NHS Foundation Trust in Manchester to begin a role as clinical trials data manager. Since February 2019 she has worked as senior clinical trials data manager at Manchester University.

Honours 

 Neumann was the only Welsh player to be named in the Women's Six Nations 'Team of the Tournament' 2021, as chosen by former World Cup winner and television pundit, Maggie Alphonsi.

References

External links 

 

1993 births
Living people
Rugby union players from Swansea
Wales international rugby union players
Welsh female rugby union players
Welsh rugby union players